is a JR East railway station located in the city of Tome, Miyagi Prefecture, Japan. The station was undamaged by the 2011 tsunami; however services have now been replaced by a provisional bus rapid transit line.

Lines
Rikuzen-Yokoyama Station is served by the Kesennuma Line, and is located 22.3 rail kilometers from the terminus of the line at Maeyachi Station.

Station layout
Rikuzen-Yokoyama Station had one side platform serving a single-bi-directional track. The station was unattended. This has been changed to a ground-level platform serving bus rapid transit service.

History
Rikuzen-Yokoyama Station opened on December 11, 1977. The station was absorbed into the JR East network upon the privatization of the Japan National Railways (JNR) on April 1, 1987. Operations were discontinued after the 2011 Tōhoku earthquake and tsunami. In 2018 the replacement bus rapid transit service was restored to a roadway on the former tracks.

Surrounding area
Japan National Route 45
Yokoyama Post Office

See also
 List of Railway Stations in Japan

External links

  
  video of a train trip from Shizugawa Station to Rikuzen-Yokoyama Station in 2009, passing Rikuzen-Togura Station at around 03:48 minutes without stopping.  Satellite photos (e.g., in Google Maps) showed that some sections of the railway were completely washed away by the 2011 tsunami, particularly near the departure point of Shizugawa Station and the vicinity of Rikuzen-Togura Station, while other sections remained intact.
  video of a train trip from Rikuzen-Yokoyama Station to Yanaizu Station in 2009

Railway stations in Miyagi Prefecture
Kesennuma Line
Railway stations in Japan opened in 1977
Railway stations closed in 2011
Tome, Miyagi
Stations of East Japan Railway Company